Dracula simia, called also monkey orchid or the monkey-like Dracula, is an epiphytic orchid originally described in the genus Masdevallia, but later moved to the genus Dracula. The arrangement of column, petals and lip strongly resembles a monkey's face. The plant blooms at any season with several flowers on the inflorescence that open successively. Flowers are fragrant with the scent of a ripe orange.

See also 
 Monkey orchid (disambiguation)

References 

simia